The 2020–21 season is the Gol Gohar Football Club's 2nd season in the Iran Pro League. They will also competing in the Hazfi Cup.

Players

First team squad
Last updated:

Transfers

Summer

In:

Out:

winter 

In:

Out:

Competitions

Overview

Persian Gulf Pro League

Standings

Results summary

Results by round

Matches

Hazfi Cup

Statistics

Squad statistics

See also
 2020–21 Persian Gulf Pro League
 2020–21 Hazfi Cup

References

External links
 Iran Premier League Statistics
 Persian League

Gol Gohar